Dilston Castle is a ruined 15th-century tower house situated at Dilston, near Corbridge, Northumberland, England. It has scheduled monument and Grade I listed building protection.

A three-storey tower was built by Sir William Claxton on the site of an earlier pele tower in the 15th century.

The Radclyffe family
In 1621 the castle was acquired by the Radclyffe family as a result of the marriage of Edward Radclyffe to the Dilston heiress. The Catholic Radclyffes built a private chapel adjacent to the house in 1616 (the chapel also has ancient monument and listed building status). (Four of the Radcliffe children including Margaret Radcliffe were abroad in a convent.)

In 1622 Sir Francis Radclyffe incorporated the tower house into a new manor house, which was to become known as Dilston Hall.

A later Francis Radclyffe was a supporter of the Royalist cause during the Civil War and his estates including Dilston Hall were sequestrated by the Commonwealth. The property was reverted to the family at the Restoration.  The 3rd Earl began in 1709 an ambitious programme to replace the old house with a substantial mansion. The new mansion was never completed. The 3rd Earl James Radclyffe took part in the Jacobite rising of 1715, was convicted of treason and executed in 1716. The ghost of his wife is reputed to haunt the castle.

His brother Charles Radclyffe, also involved in the rebellion, escaped to France, but was (like his brother) attainted of high treason. He returned to support the later 1745 uprising, was captured and executed in 1746 in accordance with the sentence imposed 30 years before.

The Derwentwater estates after 1716
The attainder of the 3rd Earl would normally have resulted in his property (including Dilston) passing to the Crown.  However, he only had a life interest under his 1712 marriage settlement, so that his estates passed to his two-year-old son John, who died aged 18.  On his death in 1731, the estates would have passed to his uncle Charles Ratclyffe, who was still living abroad, but he had also been attainted in 1716. After him, the estates might have passed to his son James Bartholomew Radclyffe, 4th Earl of Newburgh, but an Act of Parliament (4 Geo. 1 c. 21) had been passed in 1731 amending ("explaining") an Act of Queen Anne concerning naturalisation (7 Ann. c. 5) so as to exclude the children born abroad to attainted persons from being British subjects. This prevented James Lord Kinnaird and any siblings from inheriting (since foreigners could not own land in England).  Accordingly, the estate would have reverted to the right heirs of the 3rd Earl, but his interest was also forfeit to the Crown.

The Forfeited Estates Commission had offered for sale in July 1723 the interests in remainder in the Derwentwater estates contingent upon the death without male issue of John. These were purchased by William Smith of Billiter Square, London for £1,060.  However the sale was irregular, because the original contract was cancelled and a new one made, in the presence of two commissioners (rather than the quorum of four) and without the sale being re-advertised, as required. Accordingly, the sale was declared void by a 1731 Act. The purchase was, according to the commissioners' registrar, made on behalf of a group including John Bond, Sir Joseph Eyles and Matthew White.  This was a speculative purchase, since it depended on the failure of a prior interest, but in the events which happened, it would have given Smith and his colleagues property worth £5,000 per year at the time of the sale, and over £6,000 by the time that the sale was questioned. The commissioners responsible for the invalid sale, Denis Bond and John Birch, were expelled from the Commons for their part in the affair, but Sir John Eyles and Sir Thomas Hales, who had conducted the original sale and whose names had been written on the final contract suffered no penalty.

The 1731 Act directed that the Court of Exchequer should sell the property, but it was not sold.  Instead, the Greenwich Hospital Act 1735 directed that Crown income from the estate (after payment of various annuities and the interest on mortgages) should be employed to completing the building of Greenwich Hospital. A further Act was passed in 1738 to deal with difficulties that had arisen under this. Following the execution of Charles Ratcliffe in 1746 (in accordance with his 1716 attainder), Lord Kinnaird as his eldest son petitioned the king, claiming to be entitled the estate, but the Commissioners of Greenwich Hospital rejected his claim, because his right had not been claimed before the Forfeit Estates Commission, and because he was an alien. Being unable to finance litigation over this, he asked that the king make financial provision for him, and his mother Charlotte Maria Radclyffe, 3rd Countess of Newburgh (with his approval) asked for provision for his brother and three sisters.   Accordingly, a compromise was reached that the Hospital Commissioners should pay Lord Kinnaird £24,000, and that £6,000 should be divided among his siblings, else they would have all become destitute upon the death of their mother.

On the Countess' death in 1755, Lord Kinnaird succeeded as 4th Earl of Newburgh, and lived until 1786. The 5th Earl of Newburgh then applied to Parliament for restitution of the estates, but was granted an annuity of £2,500, which he and his widow enjoyed until the deaths in 1814 and 1861 respectively. The hospital's revenue from the estates had risen by the 1780s to £15,000.  The estate remained in the hands of Greenwich Hospital until the commissioners transferred it to the Admiralty Board under the Greenwich Hospital Act 1865. The board then sold the estate to Wentworth Blackett Beaumont, 1st Baron Allendale. Dilston Hall (left uncompleted on the execution of the 3rd Earl) was used as the residence for Greenwich Hospital's steward, but the commissioners ordered its demolition in 1765, leaving standing only the castle tower and the chapel.

Restoration of the castle
A restoration of the buildings began in 2001 and the castle was opened to the public for a time in 2003.

In 2004, £220,000 was awarded to begin work renovating the early 17th-century bridge (The Lord's Bridge) near the castle, as well as securing the survival of the Jacobean range of buildings with cobbled floor that share the grounds with the castle.

The recent excavations have revealed the remains of the demolished Dilston Hall and its 17th-century service range, and have also found evidence of medieval occupation of the site. The restorations of the castle, funded by the Heritage Lottery Fund, included work on a new roof, repointing, and the construction of a new floor, constructed of timber, and a staircase in the castle to access the upper levels.

The castle also shares its grounds with a chapel, which is also protected under the same historic building laws as the castle.

The castle is situated on the same grounds as Cambian Dilston College, a residential college for young adults with learning difficulties. The college was originally a maternity ward, until Lord Rix changed it into the current learning difficulties college, having a daughter with LD himself.

References

External links
 
 
   Historic Dilston
   Structures of the North East
 Images of Dilston Castle
 Details of possible access

Country houses in Northumberland
Grade I listed buildings in Northumberland
Castles in Northumberland
Scheduled monuments in Northumberland
Ruins in Northumberland
Corbridge